An  is a belt of varying size and shape worn with both traditional Japanese clothing and uniforms for Japanese martial arts styles. Originating as a simple thin belt in Heian period Japan, the  developed over time into a belt with a number of different varieties, with a number of different sizes and proportions, lengths, and methods of tying. The , which once did not differ significantly in appearance between men and women, also developed into a greater variety of styles for women than for men.

 are categorised by their design, formality, material, and use, and can be made of a number of types of fabric, with heavy brocade weaves worn for formal occasions, and some lightweight silk  worn for informal occasions.  are also made from materials other than silk, such as cotton, hemp and polyester, though silk  are considered a necessity for formal occasions.

Though  can be inexpensive when bought second-hand, they typically cost more than a kimono, particularly when purchased brand-new.

History

Heian period to Edo period

Men's and women's  were similar. At the beginning of the 17th century, both women and men wore a thin, ribbon-like . By the 1680s, the width of women's  had already doubled from its original size.

Before the Edo period, which began in the mid-1600s,  robes were fastened with a narrow sash at the hips. The mode of attaching the sleeve widely to the torso part of the garment would have prevented the use of wider . When the sleeves of the  began to grow in both horizontal width and vertical length at the beginning of the Edo period, the  widened as well. There were two reasons for this: firstly, to maintain the aesthetic balance of the outfit, the longer sleeves needed a wider sash to accompany them; secondly, unlike today (where they are customary only for unmarried women) married women also wore long-sleeved kimono in the 1770s. The use of long sleeves without leaving the underarm open would have hindered movements greatly. These underarm openings in turn made room for even wider .

Originally, all  were tied in the front. Later, fashion began to affect the position of the knot, and  could be tied to the side or to the back. By the end of the 17th century  were mostly tied in the back. However, the custom did not become firmly established before the beginning of the 20th century.

At the end of the 18th century, it was fashionable for a woman's  to have overly long hems that were allowed to trail behind when in house.

Modern day
The originally-everyday  is the most common  used today, and fancy  may even be accepted as a part of a semi-ceremonial outfit.

Tatsumura Textile located in Nishijin in Kyoto is a centre of  manufacture today. Founded by Heizo Tatsumura I in the 19th century, it is renowned for making some of the most luxurious  available. Amongst Tatsumura's students studying design was the later-painter Inshō Dōmoto.

The technique , traditionally produced in the Nishijin area of Kyoto, is intricately woven and can have a three dimensional effect, costing up to 1 million yen.

Women's 

Often, the  can adjust the formality of the entire kimono outfit, with the same kimono being worn to occasions of differing formality depending on the  worn with it. Most women's  no longer keep the kimono closed, owing to their stiffness and width, and a number of ties worn under the  keep the kimono in place.

Women's  types 

The most formal and expensive of these is patterned brocade on both sides. The second type is two-thirds patterned, the so-called "60% ", and is somewhat cheaper and lighter than the first type.
The part wound around the body is folded when put on.
Tying it is relatively easy, and does not require pads or strings.
 are made from cloth stiff enough that the  does not need a lining or a sewn-in stiffener.
 was invented in the 1970s in Nishijin, Kyoto. It thus can also be turned inside out for wear like reversible .
 is the most formal type of women's , though all but obsolete today. It is made from cloth about 68 cm wide and is folded around a double lining and sewn together.  were at their most popular during the Taishō and Meiji periods.
 – also called  – is the most-used  type today. A  is distinguished by its structure: one end is folded and sewn in half, the other end is of full width. A  can be partly- or fully-patterned. The new, easy-to-use  gained popularity among Tokyo's geisha, from whom it then was adopted by fashionable city women for their everyday wear.The formality of a  depends on its material, just as with other  types. This  was cord-like.
 is a name for  used in dance acts.
 are a style of  made by using strips of old cloth, woven into a narrow, striped fabric. The warp yarn is typically an actual yarn, whereas the strips of recycled cloth as used as the weft; though narrow,  may require cloth the equivalent of three kimonos' worth to create. Historically woven at home out of necessity,  are informal, and are generally not worn outside the house.
 resemble , but are considered to be more formal. They are usually wider and made from fancier cloth more suitable for celebration. The patterns usually include auspicious, celebratory motifs.
It often has a separate, internally-stiffened knot piece, and a piece that is wrapped around the waist.

Accessories for women's 

The  can be worn by women at any age, with it being custom to show more of the  the younger one is. It can be tied in a variety of different ways, and is commonly dyed using the  – typically the  – dye technique.
The  can be both functional and decorative, serving to keep certain  in place and add extra decoration to an outfit. Woven or otherwise, most  feature tassels at each end.
  is a small pillow that supports and shapes the  knot.

Men's 

Men's  types
 are soft, informal  made from drapey and often -dyed fabrics such as crêpe, silk , cotton and others.
Depending on its material, colours and patterns,  are suitable for any and all occasions, from the most informal to the most formal of situations.  are most commonly made of ), but can also be made from silk pongee (known as ), silk gauze and heavier, brocade-type weaves of silk.

Accessories

Men's  are not generally worn with accessories, being for the most part too thin to accommodate any of the accessories worn with women's .

And from the end of the Edo period to the Meiji period,  became a complete art collection. Nowadays,  are rarely worn as kimono accessories, but there are collectors all over the world.

Children's 

The youngest children wear soft, scarf-like .

Children's  types
 is a type of men's . It is named for its length, three . During the Edo period, it gained popularity as a simple and easy-to-wear  paired with casual, everyday kimono. According to some theories, the  originates from a scarf of the same length, which was folded and used as a sash. It is usually made from soft cotton-like cloth.
 were previously worn to prevent kimono from trailing along the floor when walking outside, used to tie up the excess length when going out; over time, this style of wear became the standard for wearing kimono both inside and outside, evolving into the  hip fold worn today. Nowadays the 's only function is decorative. It is part of a 7-year-old girl's outfit for celebration of Shichi-Go-San.
  (pre-tied ) are popular as children's  because of their ease of use. There are even formal  available for children.

In martial arts 

In many martial arts the colour of the  signifies the wearer's skill level. Usually the colours start from the beginner's white and end in the advanced black, or masters' red and white.

Knots
Though  functioned to hold the kimono closed for many centuries, beginning in the Edo period, the  became too wide and/or too stiff to function effectively in this manner. In the modern day, a number of ties and accessories are used to keep the kimono in place, with the  functioning in a more decorative capacity.

Though most styles of  can be tied by oneself, some varieties of formal women's  can be difficult to tie successfully without the assistance of others.

In earlier days, the knots were believed to banish malicious spirits. Many knots have a name with an auspicious double meaning.

Types of knots

The knot requires a very long , so it can be usually only be made for little girls.
  is a very complex and decorative knot resembling an iris blossom. It is considered suitable for young women in informal situations and parties.
  is a contemporary knot suitable for young women, often worn to formal occasions at the lowest end of "formal". Because of the complexity of the knot, a multi-coloured or strongly patterned  should not be used, and the patterns of the kimono should generally match the knot.
Most pre-tied  are tied with this knot.
In the past, courtesans and daughters of rich merchants would also have their  tied in this manner.
  is a decorative knot that resembles a sparrow with its wings spread, and is generally worn only by young women. Traditionally, the  worn with a  indicated a woman was available for marriage.
  is a subdued  which is commonly worn by men, and sometimes worn by older women for convenience, or by women in general as a style choice.
The short  worn by children is also tied in this way.
  is the most commonly-worn knot worn by women in the present day. It is a knot with a simple, subdued appearance, and resembles a box with a short tail underneath. Though the knot is associated with the  drum, the knot was actually created to celebrate the opening of the Taikobashi bridge in Tokyo in 1823 by some geisha, a style which soon widely caught on.
The knot has an auspicious double meaning of "double joy".
  is a bow resembling a certain plant thought to look like an eagle taking flight.

Gallery

See also 
 Kimono
 Obi strip: a paper band around a book
 Traditional Japanese clothing
 Cummerbund belt

References

Bibliography

External links

Fashion accessories
Japanese sashes
Japanese words and phrases
History of Asian clothing